The Hotel Atlantic Hamburg is a historic luxury hotel in Hamburg, Germany, opened in 1909. It is located in the St. Georg district, between the Außenalster lake and the Hamburg Hauptbahnhof.

History  

The Hotel Atlantic was constructed at a cost of 14 million gold marks and was designed to house passengers on transatlantic ocean liners of the Hamburg America Line (HAPAG) and the Hamburg South America Line. It was opened on 2 May 1909 by Chancellor Bernhard von Bülow and HAPAG general director Albert Ballin. Following the end of World War II, it was requisitioned by the British Armed Forces and used as their Hamburg headquarters from 1945 to 1950. The hotel reopened on 1 March 1950. In 1957, the hotel was sold to the Kempinski chain.

In 1994, German financier Dieter Bock sold Kempinski Hotels, but maintained ownership of the Hotel Atlantic. In 1997, parts of the James Bond movie Tomorrow Never Dies were filmed in the hotel. Owner Dieter Bock choked to death in the hotel on May 12, 2010. In 2014, the hotel was sold to German billionaire Bernard Broermann. In 2017, it was announced that the hotel would cease to be managed by Kempinski in January 2021 and would switch to Marriott's Autograph Collection chain. The hotel left Kempinski on January 13, 2021.

Notable guests 

Subash Chandra Bose (1942)
Mohammad Reza Pahlavi, Shah of Iran and Queen Soraya (1955)
Charles de Gaulle (1962)
King Haile Selassie
Josephine Baker
Otto Hahn
Zarah Leander
Gina Lollobrigida
Aristotle Onassis
Maria Callas
Willy Brandt
Oskar Kokoschka
Herbert von Karajan
Neil Armstrong
Juliette Gréco
Peter O'Toole
Henry Kissinger
Plácido Domingo
Giorgio Armani
Heino Ferch
Morgan Freeman
Andre Agassi
Berto Correia de Sousa
David Copperfield
Michael Jackson
Keanu Reeves
Arnold Schwarzenegger
Helmut Schmidt
Udo Lindenberg
The Supremes (March 1965)

See also  

 List of hotels in Germany

References

External links 

 Hotel Atlantic Hamburg, Autograph Collection official website
 

Autograph Collection Hotels
Hotels in Germany
Buildings and structures in Hamburg-Mitte
1909 establishments in Germany
Hotel buildings completed in 1909
Hotels established in 1909